Audrey Marie Santo (December 19, 1983 – April 14, 2007), often referred to as Little Audrey, was an American girl from Worcester, Massachusetts through whom miracles were purported to have happened after she suffered severe brain damage in a near-drowning accident.

Accident

Audrey Santo was the youngest of four children born to Linda and Steve Santo. On August 9, 1987, three-year-old Audrey was playing outside in the driveway with her four-year-old brother Stephen. When Stephen came inside alone, Linda and her twelve-year-old son, Matthew, went to look for Audrey and found her face down in the backyard swimming pool. Matthew dove in and pulled Audrey from the pool, and she was rushed to the hospital.

Audrey remained in a coma for about three weeks, in intensive care. According to Linda Santo, doctors recommended she be placed in an institution, but the family wanted her at home. In November, almost four months following the accident, Audrey was brought home.

Audrey's father Steve Santo left the family during the weeks after the accident. He returned years later, only to leave again.

Health

Once she returned home, Audrey required 24-hour nursing care, provided by her family and a team of nurses provided by the Massachusetts Commission for the Blind. She breathed through a ventilator and was on a feeding tube for sustenance, purportedly taking only communion wafers by mouth.

Audrey's family contended that she was in a state called akinetic mutism — unable to speak and with limited movement, but fully alert and awake. However, Edward Kaye, the pediatric neurologist who treated her for eight years following the accident, told a Washington Post reporter that "the cell death is about as bad as you can get and still be alive. Her EEGs are profoundly abnormal. She has brain stem activity, but very, very little above the brain stem." A coma specialist, Ed Cooper, brought in by Linda Santo to help Audrey communicate with her hands, told CBS's 48 Hours in 1999, "If she can become consistent with movements of her hands, down for 'yes,' up for 'no,' or vice versa, it would be meaningful. Right now it's inconsistent."

Međugorje

The Santo family is Catholic. About a year after the accident, Linda took Audrey to Međugorje, which is a popular pilgrimage site in the then Yugoslavia, where the Virgin Mary is purported to have appeared periodically to six local Catholics since 1981. This was a difficult and expensive journey with an incapacitated four-year-old child, but Linda believed it would result in Audrey being healed, even bringing a pair of sandals for Audrey to use once she was restored to health.

Audrey was present at one of the alleged apparitions. According to her mother, she seemed to be aware, and nodded her head as if to say 'yes'. Linda states that Audrey communicated directly with the Virgin Mary and agreed to become a victim soul. In popular, or folk spirituality, a "victim soul" is someone who willingly takes on the suffering of others.  Per the local bishop's statement, the Catholic Church recognizes only one victim soul, that of Jesus himself.

Audrey subsequently went into cardiac arrest and almost died, requiring a medical evacuation back to the United States. Her mother interpreted the child's heart failure as due to the apparition site's proximity to "the biggest abortion clinic in Yugoslavia".

Miracle claims

After the family returned from Međugorje, numerous miracles were purported to have occurred in Audrey's bedroom and within the house. The claimed miracles in Audrey's home included icons weeping blood or oil, a bleeding statue of Jesus, blood appearing spontaneously in a tabernacle and on consecrated communion wafers, oil dripping down the walls of the garage, and the Virgin Mary appearing in cloud formations overhead. Linda Santo and a nurse have also allege that Audrey sometimes bore the stigmata, although this has never been documented with a photograph. Miraculous healings were attributed to Audrey and people with various diseases or injuries claim to have been cured either by visiting Audrey's house or by intercessory prayer offered by others at Audrey's house.

As word spread about Audrey, hundreds of visitors began coming to pray for healing near Audrey's bedside. Eventually, the family set up visiting hours and built a window in Audrey's bedroom wall through which visitors could view her. The window was later removed by order of the bishop. Audrey was also on several occasions taken to a nearby college stadium or a large church, for a mass at which she could be viewed by the public.

Oil

Starting with one painting, and spreading to include many paintings and icons within the home, oil was said to exude from many objects near Audrey, and to spontaneously fill containers. No one ever claimed to have seen the moment of onset of such an event, only the already-oiled item. The oil was collected in cups and given to visitors on cotton balls.

A test commissioned by The Washington Post from Microbac Laboratories of Pittsburgh found that sample contained 80 percent corn or soybean oil, and 20 percent chicken fat. Another test done by 20/20 found a sample of the oil to be 75% olive oil, and other tests found different or inconclusive results. Linda Santo agreed in response to a reporter's questioning that it was impossible to prove someone did not apply the oil to the statues, but insisted that she had not done so herself.

Blood

During several masses at which Audrey was present, what seemed to be human blood appeared on consecrated communion wafers, or "hosts," although as with the oil no one claims they saw the moment the blood appeared. A substance that appeared to be blood also appeared in a chalice at the Santo home, and a statue of Mary appeared to cry blood.

There have been no published accounts of tests on the blood. The Washington Post story says that Audrey's pediatrician, John Harding, intended to examine the blood-smeared communion wafer under a microscope but felt that would be blasphemous and decided to use a magnifying glass instead. No findings from this examination are mentioned. In the same story, Linda Santo is quoted as saying, "'If there weren't four bleeding hosts,' she asks, 'if there was just a child in a bed, would anyone pay attention to this?'"

Healing

Some people have claimed that visiting Audrey, praying for her intercession, or having others pray or visit on their behalf has resulted in miraculous healing, including Joey Parolisi of Methuen, Massachusetts who claims his mother's prayer at Audrey's bedside healed his injury, although his physician stated that Joey had always had a 75% chance of recovering. A Rhode Island mother also claims that an intercessory prayer to Audrey saved her choking daughter. A woman with metastatic breast cancer, Andrea Pearson, attributed her improvement to Audrey, although her oncologist attributed the improvement to a medication she had just started taking. Pearson's cancer later spread to the brain.

Audrey once had a rash similar to a rash usually experienced by those undergoing chemotherapy for cancer, although Audrey never underwent such therapy. Those around her believed this was evidence that, as a "victim soul", she had taken on the suffering of some visitor with cancer.

Death and funeral
Audrey died on April 14, 2007, from cardio-respiratory failure. Family, friends and clergy were at her side. The vigil was held April 17, 2007 and the funeral mass on April 18, 2007, both at St. Paul's Cathedral in Worcester, Massachusetts. The public was allowed to attend these two events, but the burial was private.

Catholic Church's position
In 1999, the Catholic Bishop of Worcester at the time, Daniel P. Reilly, released his preliminary findings on the case. In that report, the Bishop said that "The most striking evidence of the presence of God in the Santo home is seen in the dedication of the family to Audrey."

As for the purported miracles, he said "I want to underscore that any paranormal occurrences are not miraculous in and of themselves".

He also stated in regard to the claim that Audrey was a purported "victim soul", "We must proceed quite cautiously here, since this term is not commonly used by the Church except for Christ himself who became the victim for our sins and transgressions on the cross."  The report further states that "The term "victim soul" is not an official term in the Church. It was used in some circles in the 18th and 19th century when there was a fascination with suffering and death."

With regard to the many pilgrims who were praying to Audrey while she was still alive, he said "praying to Audrey is not acceptable in Catholic teaching." Further, it was stated that "One should only pray for Audrey. Our faith teaches us to pray to God and to pray for the intercession of the saints. Therefore, the distribution of a "Prayer to Audrey" should cease immediately."

In the case of the alleged "miracle oil," his report stated: "We must be careful not to identify this oil as "holy oil," which could be used to anoint a person. The Sacrament of the Anointing of the Sick, which can only be celebrated by a priest or bishop, uses oil blessed by the bishop at the Mass of Chrism, and is given to those who are seriously ill."

The bishop's report does not confirm any of the alleged miracles and cautions against some of the beliefs being promoted. However, the bishop praised the care Audrey had received from her family.  He lauded the "excellent care the family gives to their daughter. This has manifested itself in her physical condition, for example, she has not apparently had bedsores in the eleven years she has been confined to her bed."  He celebrated their "constant love and devotion to their daughter is a miracle in the broad sense of the word. They have always recognized the human dignity of their daughter, despite the circumstances."

Case for sainthood

A nonprofit foundation is pursuing the process of sainthood for Audrey. The Bishop of Worcester, Robert J. McManus, gave official recognition to the foundation, allowing them to present their application to the Congregation for the Causes of Saints in Rome, while remaining neutral himself as to whether Audrey should be a saint.

Beatification and canonization require at least two fully documented and authenticated miracles. The board of directors of the Audrey Santo Foundation asked in a web update on August 12, 2013, that "if anyone has specific knowledge of any such miracles, they must come forward [so] that the proper protocol is followed."

References

External links
 
 
 Video Interview with Linda Santo
 

1983 births
2007 deaths
American children
Deaths from multiple organ failure
People from Worcester, Massachusetts
People with hypoxic and ischemic brain injuries
Stigmatics
American Servants of God
21st-century venerated Christians
Catholics from Massachusetts